Dafgård may refer to 

 Jörgen Dafgård, a Swedish composer
 Gunnar Dafgård AB, a Swedish food company